Stevenage Town Football Club was a football club based in Stevenage, Hertfordshire, England. The club existed from 1894 until 1968, after which Stevenage Athletic were established.

History
The club were established in 1894 as Stevenage Town. They were renamed Stevenage Wanderers the following year, before merging with a club named Rovers, at which point the club reverted to their original name. They joined the Herts County League in 1899 but left after a single season. They rejoined in 1901 and were placed in the Northern Division. They left the league in 1925 when it was disbanded.

In 1951 the club were founder members of the Delphian League. In 1956 they merged with Stevenage Rangers to form Stevenage Football Club, before reverting to Stevenage Town four years later. They moved to Broadhall Way in 1961, and in 1963 they joined Division One of the Southern League. After finishing third in 1966–67 they were promoted to the Premier Division. They finished eighteenth in their first season in the Premier Division, their highest-ever league finish, but folded at the end of the season. A new club, Stevenage Athletic, was formed in their place.

Records
Highest league position: Eighteenth in the Southern League Premier Division, 1967–68
Best FA Cup performance: Third qualifying round second replay, 1966–67

References

 
Defunct football clubs in England
Association football clubs established in 1894
Association football clubs disestablished in 1968
Southern Football League clubs
Defunct football clubs in Hertfordshire
Stevenage
Delphian League
1894 establishments in England
1968 disestablishments in England